Nikolai Fyodorovich Gerasimenko is a Russian surgeon and politician.

He was born on December 1, 1950, in Verkh-Suyetka, in the former Soviet Union to a family of municipal employee and school teacher. He studied at Altai State Medical University and later worked for I.M. Sechenov First Moscow State Medical University. As a surgeon he performed about 10,000 operations. He is an Honored Doctor of the Russian Federation, Academician of the Russian Academy of Medical Sciences (2002), member of the Presidium of the Russian Academy of Medical Sciences, and a member of the council of the all-Russian public organization "League of the Health of the Nation".

He was a member of the 2nd, 3rd, 4th, 5th, 6th, and 7th State Dumas in 1995–2021. Chair of State Duma Healthcare and Sports committee in 1995–2003. In 2019, the State Duma lifted his parliamentary immunity due to a road accident at Leninsky Avenue, Moscow. Gerasimenko was found guilty of a traffic violation in which a motorcyclist was injured, and his driver's licence was revoked.

References 

1950 births
Living people
People from Altai Krai
People's Party of the Russian Federation politicians
United Russia politicians
Second convocation members of the State Duma (Russian Federation)
Third convocation members of the State Duma (Russian Federation)
Fourth convocation members of the State Duma (Russian Federation)
Fifth convocation members of the State Duma (Russian Federation)
Sixth convocation members of the State Duma (Russian Federation)
Seventh convocation members of the State Duma (Russian Federation)
Russian surgeons